Cambarus spicatus, the Broad River spiny crayfish is a species of crayfish in the family Cambaridae. It is endemic to the Carolinas in the United States of America. The common name refers to the Broad River.

References

Further reading

 
 
 

Cambaridae
Articles created by Qbugbot
Freshwater crustaceans of North America
Crustaceans described in 1956
Taxa named by Horton H. Hobbs Jr.